Hufford is a surname. Notable people with the surname include:

Chris Hufford, English audio engineer, record producer, and band manager
Del Hufford (1901–1984), American football player
Paul Hufford, American football player
Susan Hufford (1938–2006), American actress and psychotherapist